Ticlo Glenn D'Souza is an Indian Politician from the state of Goa. He was a two-term member of the Goa Legislative Assembly representing the Aldona constituency.

Posts
He is the chairman of the Goa Industrial Development Corporation.

Committees in the Goa Legislative Assembly
He is a member of the following committees in the house 
Chairman	Committee On Government Assurances
Member		Committee On Public Undertakings
Member		Select Committee on The Goa Land Use
Member	Select Committee on The Goa Commission for Minorities

Controversy
A section of media reportedly  alleged that Aldona Bharatiya Janata Party   Member of the Goa Legislative Assembly Ticlo Glenn D'Souza was a Portuguese national.

External links 
 Member of the Goa Legislative Assembly 
Bharatiya Janata Party Members of the Goa Legislative Assembly

References 

Goa MLAs 2012–2017
Living people
People from North Goa district
Bharatiya Janata Party politicians from Goa
Goa MLAs 2017–2022
Year of birth missing (living people)